Technobabble (a portmanteau of technology and babble), also called technospeak, is a type of nonsense that consists of buzzwords, esoteric language, or technical jargon. It is common in science fiction.

See also 

 Academese
 Bullshit
 Bogdanov affair
 Dihydrogen monoxide parody
 Flux capacitor
 Fedspeak
 Neologism
 Officialese
 Psychobabble
 Rubber science
 Sokal affair
 Turboencabulator

References

External links 

 Technology Column called Technobabble
Technobabble Generators

Jargon
Science fiction terminology
Nonsense